The slab stela was an original form of the steles of ancient Egypt. However, it was horizontal in dimension. Some of the earliest tablets from mid- to late-3rd millennium BC were painted Slab Steles. A small list of Ancient Egyptian dignitaries or their wives had a slab stela.

Some funerary stelas were in the form of slab steles, as opposed to being of the more common vertical type.

Lintel
At the same time period of the middle 3rd millennium BC and later, some famous horizontal lintels were made. Hemon-(Hemiunu), the noted architect had one. It is housed in the Pelizaeus Museum of Germany. The horizontal lintel was used in other cultures in ancient times, for example in the Mesopotamian cultures.

See also

 Maya stelae

Ancient Egyptian stelas
Egyptian artefact types